SW Lyncis is a binary or possibly a multiple-star system in the northern constellation of Lynx, abbreviated SW Lyn. With a combined apparent visual magnitude of 9.58, it is too faint to be visible to the naked eye. The system is located at a distance of approximately 970 light years based on parallax measurements, and is drifting further away with a net radial velocity of about +32 km/s.

The variable luminosity of this system was reported by R. Kippenhahn in 1955. Huth in 1958 classified it as a β Lyr-type variable. H. Mauder classified this as an eclipsing binary of the Algol type based on a light curve assembled in 1960. J. K. Gleim in 1967 noted that the period of the system had changed, suggesting that there may be a third body in the system. He considered it to be a member of the β Lyr class, although it is more closely related to the Algol type than W Ursae Majoris variables.

M. Vetešník noted in 1968 that the light curve for the system appeared noticeably asymmetric. He published orbital elements for this system in 1977 and found a stellar classification of F2V for the primary component. A low mass ratio suggested the secondary is much smaller and less luminous than the primary. L. Qingyao and associates in 1991 concluded that this is a semi-detached system with one of the components filling its Roche lobe, and thought the secondary to be over-sized and over-luminous for its mass. The third component is thought to contribute less than 1.5% of the light output of the system.

In 2010, C.-H. Kim and associates performed modelling of the 34-year cycle variations of the system and conjectured that two additional circumbinary companions are creating this effect. However, subsequent studies suggest that such a configuration would be too unstable. The system behavior remains unexplained. SW Lyn is presently classified as a near contact binary that decreases in brightness to magnitude 10.20 during the primary eclipse and to magnitude 9.65 with the secondary eclipse.

References

Further reading

F-type main-sequence stars
Spectroscopic binaries
Algol variables
Beta Lyrae variables

Lynx (constellation)
Durchmusterung objects
067008
039771
Lyncis, SW